Kent Andersson (born 24 October 1959) is a Swedish wrestler. He competed at the 1980 Summer Olympics and the 1984 Summer Olympics.

References

External links
 

1959 births
Living people
Swedish male sport wrestlers
Olympic wrestlers of Sweden
Wrestlers at the 1980 Summer Olympics
Wrestlers at the 1984 Summer Olympics
Sportspeople from Stockholm
20th-century Swedish people